Koma Wong Ka Kui (10 June 1962 – 30 June 1993) was a Hong Kong musician, singer, and songwriter. He gained fame in Asia as the leader and a co-founder of the rock band Beyond, where he was the lead vocalist, rhythm guitarist, and primary songwriter, and his younger brother Wong Ka Keung played bass.

Life and career

Early life 
Wong grew up in So Uk Estate, Sham Shui Po.

As a junior in secondary school, he was introduced to European and American music by a schoolmate and later became a fan of David Bowie. Until the age of 15, he taught himself to play guitar after acquiring an acoustic guitar pre-owned by a neighbour. When developing his guitar skills, he bought a second-hand electric guitar, a red Fender Stratocaster in maplewood.

He once worked as an office assistant, a mechanic, a scenery decorator for a TV company, after his graduation from secondary school. Wong was also a salesman in the same insurance company of drummer Yip Sai Wing.

The formation of Beyond 
In 1980, Wong met drummer Yip Sai Wing through the boss from a piano company and later formed a band with their friends' lead guitarist William Tang (鄧煒謙) and bassist Lee Wing Chiu (李榮潮). In 1983, the band signed up foe participation in a contest by "Guitar Magazine" under the band name "Beyond", created by Tang who made a purpose to transcend themselves in pursuit of attainment. The band thereafter added Wong Ka Keung on bass in 1984 and Paul Wong on lead guitar in 1985. After that they held their first and only self-funding concert Waiting Forever (永遠等待演唱會) (1985).

In 1986 Lau Chi Yuen (劉志遠) joined the band as lead guitarist and keyboardist to record the band's first album Goodbye Ideals (再見理想) (1986) and EP Waiting Forever (永遠等待) (1986) without the assistance of outside record company. Until under the assistance of KINN's MUSIC LTD, operated by manager Leslie Chan (陳健添), Beyond's images and music became more public-accepted. Beyond released the album Arabian Dancing Girls (亞拉伯跳舞女郎) (1987) and Modern Stage (現代舞台) (1988).

1988–1991: First success, Cinepoly Records and social concerns 
In 1988, Beyond signed Cinepoly's contract with proprietor Chan Siu Po (陳少寶) and made the album Secret Police (秘密警察) (1988). They won awards in Jade Solid Gold Best Ten Music Awards Presentation by a hit from this album "The Grand Earth (大地)". In 1989, the band won awards by the song "Truly Love You" (真的愛你) from the album Beyond IV (1989) in Jade Solid Gold Best Ten Music Awards Presentation and both RTHK Top 10 Gold Songs Awards.

In 1990, Beyond won awards by the song "Glorious Years (光輝歲月)" from the album Destiny Party (命運派對) (1990) in Jade Solid Gold Best Ten Music Awards Presentation. Wong also won "the Best Lyrics Award" individually rather than with the band.

From 1990 to 1991, Beyond paid more attention to the social issues and ongoing events around the world. The music and lyrics in the song "Glorious Years" (光輝歲月) was created during Wong's visit to New Guinea in 1990 and it is a tribute to former South-African president Nelson Mandela. In 1991, the band visited Kenya and witnessed the grinding poverty and misery there. Wong was again enlightened to write music and lyrics in the song "Amani" from the album Hesitation (猶豫). Upon their return, a number of songs were written addressing the serious problems of Africa. The Beyond Third World Foundation was created in the same year with profits from the redistribution of an early album.

Career in Japan 
In the 1990s, Wong began to feel limited by the Hong Kong music industry; he once said that "there's only the entertainment industry but not a music industry in Hong Kong." Beyond thus decided to focus on their career in Japan. In January 1992, the band signed a worldwide management contract with Japanese record label Amuse. During the year, they released an album called Continue the Revolution (繼續革命). In May 1993, Beyond returned to Hong Kong with a new album Rock and Roll (樂與怒). Wong's signature work "Boundless Oceans, Vast Skies" (海闊天空) won the Best Original Song award in Hong Kong. Before they went back to Japan, Beyond held unplugged live concerts in Hong Kong and Malaysia, which were Beyond's last concert with Wong Ka Kui.

Death 
Beyond arrived in Japan in January 1993 to record new material and engage in media appearances. On 24 June 1993, the band appeared at a Tokyo Fuji Television game show called  . An accident occurred 15 minutes after the show commenced. The stage floor was very narrow and slippery, and Wong fell off the platform with one of the hosts Teruyoshi Uchimura live on the air. Wong Ka Kui fell 2.7 metres to the ground, landing headfirst and falling into a coma immediately when the host landed on the chest without any serious injury. Wong was rushed to the hospital. Given the traumatic seriousness, no prompt operation was conducted for medical cautiousness.

On 26 June, several music fans of Beyond gathered at the carpark lot of the Commercial Radio Hong Kong Station to pray for him. The next day, as doctors declared the case helpless, a Traditional Chinese medicine practitioner arrived to treat Wong, who showed slight improvement afterwards. Six days later, at 16:15, in Tokyo Women's Medical University Hospital, on 30 June 1993, a Japanese representative announced Wong's death in a press conference.

Wong's body was transported to Hong Kong on 3 July, with hundreds of people awaiting its arrival at Kai Tak Airport. His funeral procession took place two days later, bringing various major streets in Hong Kong to a standstill. Thousands of celebrities and fans attended his funeral service. Wong was buried in Tseung Kwan O Chinese Permanent Cemetery, with his Martin D-28 acoustic guitar. His tombstone is made of white marble and bears the image of a guitar.

Legacy 
The song "Boundless Oceans, Vast Skies" was written by Wong and has been an anthem of Cantonese rock music and one of Beyond's signature songs.

During a concert of Beyond in 2003, Wong was resurrected in the form of a life-size video projection, alongside the remaining band members while they sang the song "Combat for Twenty Years" (抗戰二十年) in memory of him 10 years after his death.

On 8 November 2005, Hong Kong post office released a stamp collection called "Hong Kong Pop Singers". Wong was one of the five singers who had their images printed on stamps.

In a vote conducted by Sina China in 2007, Wong was one of the Most Missed Celebrity along with Leslie Cheung and Anita Mui. There are many tribute songs dedicated to him, including "The Champion of Love" by the rock band Bakufu-Slump, "Him" by the rock band Soler, "Wish You Well" by his brother Wong Ka Keung, "Paradise" by Beyond, "Combat for twenty years" by Beyond and "The Story" by Paul Wong.

Beginning in December 2007, Radio Television Hong Kong (RTHK) released a documentary series called "A Legend Never Dies", featuring Roman Tam, Anita Mui, Leslie Cheung, Teresa Teng, Wong Ka Kui and Danny Chan. The episode of Wong was aired on TVB on 26 January 2008. The episode labelled Wong Ka Kui "The Spring Water of Hong Kong Music Industry."

Asteroid 41742 Wongkakui was named in his memory on 29 May 2018.

Filmography 
 Sworn Brothers (1987)
 No Regret (1987)
 The Black Wall (1989)
 The Fun, the Luck & the Tycoon (1989)
 Happy Ghost IV (1990)
 Beyond's Diary (1991)
 The Banquet (1991)
 Cageman (1992)

Selected awards 
 1989 – won "Song of the Year" award for the song "Truly Love You" at Hong Kong's Jade Solid Gold Awards

Notes

References

External links 
 
 Ka Kui's music on Android Phone

1962 births
1993 deaths
20th-century guitarists
20th-century Hong Kong male singers
Accidental deaths from falls
Accidental deaths in Japan
Beyond (band) members
Hong Kong Cantopop singers
Deaths from head injury
Filmed deaths of entertainers
Hong Kong idols
Hong Kong male singer-songwriters
Hong Kong Mandopop singers
Hong Kong rock guitarists
Male guitarists
Rhythm guitarists